The 1908 United States presidential election in Michigan took place on November 3, 1908, as part of the 1908 United States presidential election. Voters chose 14 representatives, or electors, to the Electoral College, who voted for president and vice president.

Michigan voted for Republican nominee William Howard Taft from Ohio over Democratic candidate Nebraskan William Jennings Bryan. The Republican ticket received nearly 62% of the vote, while the Democrats received 32%.

With 61.93% of the popular vote, Michigan would be Taft's third strongest victory in terms of percentage in the popular vote after Vermont and Maine.

Results

Results by county
Taft won every county in Michigan.

See also
 United States presidential elections in Michigan

References

Michigan
1908
1908 Michigan elections